Sydney Prior Hall MVO, MA (18 October 1842 – 15 December 1922) was a British portrait painter and illustrator and one of the leading reportage artists of the later Victorian period.

The son of animal portraitist Harry Hall, Sydney Hall was educated at Merchant Taylors' School. He decided on a career as an artist while at Oxford University and joined the staff of The Graphic, an illustrated newspaper, shortly after its foundation in late 1869. He immediately established his name with a series of vivid drawings made at the front during the Franco-Prussian War.

As stated in the contemporary publication The Art Journal, his drawings of the Parnell Commission were among his finest achievements in the medium of graphic journalism: "he was in court the whole time, busy with a swift revealing pencil which missed no turn of affairs."

He illustrated a number of books including Tom Brown's School Days (MacMillan, 1885), and Tom Brown at Oxford by Thomas Hughes.

Hall married Emma Holland (1846/7–1894), in 1877; the couple had already produced a son, Henry R. H. Hall (1873-1930), who became assistant keeper of Egyptian and Assyrian antiquities at the British Museum. Following the death of his first wife, Hall married the painter Mary Gow (1851–1929), in 1907. Hall died at his home in London on 15 December 1922.

Gallery

References

External links

 Sketches from an Artist's Portfolio, Sydney P. Hall, 1875.
 Four paintings by Sir Sydney Hall in the Royal Collection of Queen Elizabeth II
 Some sketches by Sir Sydney Hall (part of a collection of 146 held by the National Portrait Gallery (London) which were donated in 1929 by the artist's son, Harry Reginald Holland Hall)
 Drawings of Canada in 1881 by Sydney Hall (Hall was a member of the press party which accompanied the Governor General of Canada, Sir John Douglas Campbell, on a much-publicised tour to promote the agricultural potential of western Canada).
 Portrait of the three daughters of King Edward VII and Queen Alexandra by Sydney Prior Hall (oil on canvas, 1883, National Portrait Gallery, London)
 Pencil drawing of William Ewart Gladstone by Sydney Prior Hall

1842 births
1922 deaths
19th-century British painters
British male painters
20th-century British painters
British draughtsmen
British illustrators
British children's book illustrators
19th-century war artists
People educated at Merchant Taylors' School, Northwood
British war artists
19th-century British male artists
20th-century British male artists